Dayo Olatunji, known professionally as Dyo (formerly Ms D), is an English singer-songwriter.

Early life
Dyo grew up in East Ham, East London. Her mother was born in the United Kingdom, and her father was born in Lagos, Nigeria.

Having started to sing at the age of 4, at age 10 she started to take part in talent shows, competitions and performing in school assemblies.

Career

2009–2016: Ms D
Under her previous stage name 'Ms D', she was credited as the featured artist and co-writer for all three of rapper Wiley's hit singles from his 2013 album The Ascent including UK Chart #1 Single "Heatwave". In December 2012, she was featured on "Dependency", the debut single by English singer Charlie Brown. She is also known for her vocals on rapper Chipmunk's 2009 UK Chart #1 single "Oopsy Daisy". Ms D was credited as a songwriter and backing vocalist for Iggy Azalea's 2013 single "Bounce".

2016–present: Dyo

In June 2016, unveiling her new stage name 'Dyo', she was credited as the featured vocalist and co-writer of pop song "Sexual" by Swedish producer NEIKED. On 15 September 2016, Dyo signed a publishing deal with Warner/Chappell Music. On 19 April 2017, Dyo was nominated for Best Contemporary Song at the 62nd Ivor Novello Awards for her songwriting work on "Sexual". On 25 August 2017, Fifth Harmony released their third studio album which features a song entitled "Lonely Night" co-written by Dyo. In 2018, she collaborated with Nigeria's Adekunle Gold on his About 30 album on a track titled Down With You and arguably the best track on the album which led to her increased popularity in her home country, Nigeria. In June 2018, Luis Fonsi released his new single 'Calypso' ft. Stefflon Don, a song on which Dyo is credited as a co-writer. On 1 October 2018, Dyo received a BMI award for her songwriting contribution on the Maroon 5 hit single 'What Lovers Do'.

In 2019, Dyo started releasing music for the first time as Dyo including her first release Arena along with Go All The Way featuring Mr Eazi. In January of 2020, Dyo released her debut EP 'Dyologue' which featured production from GuiltyBeatz and JAE5. Later that year, Dyo released a collaboration with Nigerian artist Simi called 'Let Them Talk' and was also credited as songwriter on Brit and Grammy nominated artist NAO's track "Woman" featuring Lianne La Havas.

In 2021, Dyo's songwriting credits include "Way Too Long" by Nathan Dawe featuring Anne-Marie and MoStack as well as Jesy Nelson's single "Boyz" featuring Nicki Minaj.

Discography

Extended plays

Singles

As featured artist

Songwriting credits

References

1992 births
Living people
21st-century Black British women singers
English child singers
English women singer-songwriters
English people of Yoruba descent
British contemporary R&B singers
People from East Ham
Singers from London
Yoruba women musicians